Padutha Theeyaga (transl: I will sing sweetly) is an Indian Telugu-language Reality television singing show that is aired on ETV Telugu, a channel of ETV Network, a part of Ramoji Group. The program seeks to discover the best singing talent in Telugu language. The show used to be hosted by S. P. Balasubrahmanyam, a legendary Playback singer from the state of Andhra Pradesh, India.

It is the first of its kind in South India. The main objective of this program is to bring out emerging singing talent into spotlight. Started in the year 1996 "Padutha Theeyaga" has so far completed more than 1100 episodes.

It helped identify and establish singers such as Mallikarjun, Usha, Smitha, Karunya, Hemachandra, Gopika Poornima, Kousalya, Venu, Geetha Madhuri, Malavika, Anjana Soumya, Parthasaradhi, Sandip, Madhavi Bhamidipati, Nitya Santhoshini, Sandeep Kurapati, Sri Sivathmika Medicherla and many more.

Overview
The program was first started in 1996 and continued till 2000 with 4 successful seasons. Again in 2007 the show restarted with new format and it continued till 20 September 2020, due to the unfortunate death of S. P. Balasubrahmanyam. However, from 27 September 2020, the Grand finale episodes of all seasons of the show were aired on the title of "Alanati Apurupalu". On 4 June 2021 an announcement was made, saying that the show will be hosted by S. P. Charan and will be judged by Chandrabose, Sunitha Upadrashta and Vijay Prakash. The new series debuted on ETV on 5th December 2021.

Old series 1 (1996)
Top 4 Contestants:-

Old Series 2 (Junior 1998)
Top 4 Contestants:-

Series 1 (2007)

The program was restarted again in 2007 with new format it 
was for adult contestants. They selected 3 or 2 singers from each district of  United Andhra Pradesh and gave voice of the district title to one among them and started the series with voice of the district title holders. Rajesh Kumar from Ananthapur and Lipsika from Khammam shared the first two places. Finals was judged by S. P. Balasubrahmanyam and guest judge was Devi Sri Prasad. Megastar Chiranjeevi made a special appearance in the finals and gave prizes to the contestants. The Grand Finale was conducted in Visakhapatnam. Winner Rajesh Kumar won Cash prize of Rs.10,00,000 and runner Lipsika won Rs.5,00,000. The prize money was sponsored by Suvarna Bhoomi. Grand finals was completed on October 18, 2007.

Series 2 (2008)

This season was for the junior contestants with Lakshmi Meghana, Ganesh Revanth, Anjani Nikhila, Raghawendra as finalists.Lakshmi Meghana is the winner.

Series 3 (2008)

This season was sponsored by EXO-Dishwash. In this season,  Sairamya got first prize., Damini got  second prize, and  Sarathchandra Kalahasti  and  Nuthana  got  equal marks and the two were equally given third place.

Series 4 (2009)

This season was also for the adult contestants. Ivaturi Harini, Nandibhatla Tejaswini, Rohit and Sai Charan were the finalists and these contestants stood in the first, second and the third places respectively and the third place was shared by Rohit and Sai Charan together.

Series 5 (August 2012 - January 2013)

This season had Sharath Santosh, Surya Karthik, Praveen kumar and Charumathi Pallavi as the finalists. Out of them Praveen was the first, followed by Charumathi Pallavi, Sharath and Karthik in that order. The season 5 finale had the great drummer Sivamani as  the chief guest. Even this season was for adults.

Series 6 (February 2013 - July 2013)

had kids of age 6–15.The winner was Parameshwara Rao.

Series 7 (August 2013 - March 2014)

was held at USA. The winner was Arjun Addepalli.

Series 8 (March 2014 - October 2014)

was for children of age 9–14. The winner was K.S.Abhiram. The second position was occupied by Sarvepalli Sreya, the third Geethika and fourth Maanya Chandran.  Abhiram was good at his tone, while Sarvepalli was the one who was versatile and expressive in her singing. Geethika had a good voice and Maanya, a good range. This was a very good batch with a tough competition among the participants.

Series 9 (November 2014 - June 2015)

It was also in USA, and was for ages 9–13. All participants were females. The final 8 were Meghana Pothukuchi (the winner), Neha Dharmapuram, Vishnupriya Kothamasu (finalist), Sumedha Vadlapudi (pre-finalist), Sneha Mokkala (finalist), Lasya Ravulapati, Nikhitha Pathapati (finalist), and Ananya Penugonda.

2015 Paadutha Theeyaga Selections Process

  February 15, 2015:  Last Date for submitting Audition Songs(1 Classical style and 1 Fast Beat) 
  February 28, 2015:  An email sent from PT team stating that the entries had been received and sent to Balu garu for finalizing the list of 21 contestants
     April 13, 2015:  Notifications to the final 21 contestants sent
     April 15, 2015:  Requested Copy of Birth Certificate from the finalists
     April 25, 2015:  Confirmation email sent
       May 12, 2015:  Sent a list of 13 songs which would cover 24 episodes to each participant. Next batch of 6-7 songs will be given in the second week of July.
       May 16, 2015:  Request sent to participants for full details (Full Name, City, State)
  May 12–17, 2015:  Lyrics requested for all the songs from participants. PT team corrected them and emailed back
May 29-June 6, 2015:  Half-hour Skype training sessions offered by PT team for the first four songs in the list. Training involves only fine tuning and pitch setting.

Series 10 (June 2015 - March 2016) 
Vamsi was the winner of the season.
Priya was the winner of the season.

Series 11 (March 2016 - October 2016) 
was in the US, and was for ages 13–16. Participants consisted of 15 females and 2 males. The final five were Akhila Mamandur (Winner, $10,000) from Houston, TX; Abhijith Vemulapati (Runner-up, $5,000) from Woodland, CA; Bhavna Ravichandran (Finalist, $2,500) from Greensboro, NC; Supraja Kadagandla (Finalist, $2,500) from Olympia, WA; and Priya Kanajam (Pre-Finalist, $1300) from Minneapolis, MN.

Series 12 (2017)
Top 18 Contestants:-

Series 13 (2017)

Top 18 Contestants:-

Series 14 (2018)

Top 18 Contestants:-

Series 15 (2018) 

Top 18 Contestants:-

Series 16 (2019) 

Top 18 Contestants:-

Series 17 (2019) 
From this season the program  telecasting time was changed from 9:30 PM Sunday to 11:00AM Sunday

Top 13 Contestants:-

Series 18 (2020) 

Top 18 Contestants:-

Padutha Theeyaga Finalists

References

Indian reality television series
Telugu-language television shows
ETV Telugu original programming